Al-Tubayq Natural Reserve is a protected area in Saudi Arabia managed by the Saudi Wildlife Authority.

Overview 
Al-Tubayq Natural Reserves located in the north-west of Saudi Arabia, on the border with Jordan. The reserve was listed as designated as a natural reserve in 1989. The geography of the reserve is characterized by dark rugged rocks.

Birdlife 
The reserve is home to the Nubian Ibex as well as gazelles, wolves, foxes and hares. Birdlife inhabiting this reserve includes falcons, partridges, and eagles.

See also 

 List of protected areas of Saudi Arabia

References 



External Links
Photos of Al Tubaiq Natural Reserve at the American Center of Research

Protected areas of Saudi Arabia